Psephotellus is a genus of medium sized Australian parrots. Four species found across the country are recognised, one is presumed to have become extinct.

Description 
All species show considerable sexual dimorphism. These species have traditionally been placed in the genus Psephotus along with the red-rumped parrot, but a molecular study analysing nuclear and mitochondrial DNA found that the red-rumped parrot was an early offshoot in a clade of several genera of broad-tailed parrot, with the other species nested deeply within.

Taxonomy 
The genus was first proposed by Gregory Mathews in 1913, nominating the paradise parrot Platycercus pulcherrimus Gould as the type and forming a new combination as Psephotellus pulcherrimus.

Diversity and distribution

References

 
Broad-tailed parrots
Bird genera